The 2023 Double or Nothing is the upcoming fifth annual Double or Nothing professional wrestling pay-per-view (PPV) event produced by All Elite Wrestling (AEW). It will take place during Memorial Day weekend on May 28, 2023, at the T-Mobile Arena in the Las Vegas suburb of Paradise, Nevada.

Production

Background
Double or Nothing is considered All Elite Wrestling's (AEW) marquee event, having first been held in 2019, which was the promotion's first professional wrestling event and first pay-per-view (PPV) produced. It is held annually during Memorial Day weekend and is one of AEW's "Big Four" PPVs, which includes All Out, Full Gear, and Revolution, their four biggest shows produced quarterly. The event's name is a reference to its Las Vegas theme and it is traditionally held in the Las Vegas area in Paradise, Nevada. Exceptions from this norm occurred in 2020 and 2021 due to COVID-19 pandemic restrictions that were in place at the time, but they maintained the Vegas theme. 

On March 5, 2023, during the Revolution Zero Hour pre-show, it was announced that the fifth Double or Nothing event would take place on May 28 at the T-Mobile Arena, marking the second Double or Nothing held here, after the previous year's event. It was also announced that during Double or Nothing week, both Wednesday Night Dynamite and Friday Night Rampage would air live from the nearby MGM Grand Garden Arena—the location of the inaugural Double or Nothing—on May 24 and May 26, respectively. However, due to a broadcast scheduling conflict, Rampage will instead air on tape delay as a special Saturday Night Rampage on May 27, with the event being taped immediately after the live broadcast of Dynamite. Tickets for the events went on sale on March 17.

Storylines
Double or Nothing will feature professional wrestling matches that involve different wrestlers from pre-existing feuds and storylines. Wrestlers portray heroes, villains, or less distinguishable characters in events that build tension and culminate in a wrestling match or series of matches. Storylines are produced on AEW's weekly television programs, Dynamite and Rampage, as well as the supplementary online streaming shows, Dark and Elevation.

References

Notes

External links

2023
2023 All Elite Wrestling pay-per-view events
Events in Paradise, Nevada
May 2023 events in the United States
Professional wrestling shows in the Las Vegas Valley
Scheduled professional wrestling shows